Bartholomea is a genus of sea anemones in the family Aiptasiidae.

Species 
The following species are recognized:

 Bartholomea annulata (Le Sueur, 1817)
 Bartholomea peruviana (Pax, 1912)
 Bartholomea pseudotagetes Pax, 1924
 Bartholomea werneri Watzl, 1922

References 

Aiptasiidae
Hexacorallia genera